The Franklin & Marshall College Poll (formerly the Keystone Poll) is a prominent Pennsylvania-based opinion poll. It is considered the "longest running Pennsylvania statewide poll exclusively directed and produced in the state." The poll tracks citizen opinion on politics, public affairs, public policy, and elections in Pennsylvania. Berwood Yost, director of F&M’s Center for Opinion Research, is the director and head methodologist for the poll.

The Franklin & Marshall College Poll first developed from a poll taken during the United States Senate special election in Pennsylvania, 1991, pitting incumbent Democrat Harris Wofford against former Pennsylvania Governor Dick Thornburgh. In 1992, the poll was formally inaugurated as the Keystone Poll at Millersville University of Pennsylvania, with Terry Madonna working as the director of the poll and Berwood Yost, as the head methodologist. Yost and Madonna took positions at Franklin & Marshall College in Lancaster, Pennsylvania in 2003, bringing the poll with them. The poll underwent two significant changes in 2008: it was renamed the Franklin & Marshall College Poll and it was expanded beyond its Pennsylvania roots to study national opinion for 29 Hearst-Argyle televisions stations and other media outlets. Madonna retired from Franklin & Marshall College in 2020.

During its existence, the poll has been published through a variety of media outlets. In its early years, it was carried by the Philadelphia Daily News and KYW-TV. Later, the Fox 29 replaced KYW and the Harrisburg Patriot News and the Pittsburgh Tribune-Review began carrying the poll. In 2002, the Comcast Network replaced Fox 29. The statewide distribution now includes WPVI-TV, WGAL-TV, WTAE-TV, and the Times-Shamrock Communications.

See also 

 Quinnipiac University Polling Institute
 Emerson College Polling
 Suffolk University Political Research Center
 Siena Research Institute
 Monmouth University Polling Institute
 Marist Institute for Public Opinion

References

External links
Survey Releases
Survey Archive
Franklin & Marshall College Poll Newsletter
Center for Opinion Research
Center for Politics and Public Affairs

Public opinion research companies in the United States
Franklin & Marshall College
Politics of Pennsylvania